KÍ Klaksvík Kvinnur is the women's football team of KÍ Klaksvík, a Faroese football club, based in Klaksvík and founded in 1904. The club plays in blue and white. Their stadium, Djúpumýra, has a capacity of 3,000.

The women's team was created in 1985. It is the reigning champion of the 1. deild kvinnur and the most successful in the Faroe Islands. They have won the 1. deild for a record-breaking past 17 seasons. Since the UEFA Women's Cup began in 2001, they were the only women's team to have represented the Faroe Islands in Europe until 2018, and the only team to have participated in every UEFA competition from the inaugural 2001–02 edition to date.

KÍ Klaksvík currently has eight players on the Faroe Islands women's national football team:  Óluva Joensen, Birita Ryan, Sanna Svarvadal, Tórunn Joensen, Tóra Mohr, Hervør Olsen, Maria Biskopstø and Eyðvør Klakstein.

Honours 
 1. deild kvinnur
 Winners (22): 1997, 2000 to 2016, 2019, 2020, 2021, 2022
 Faroese Women's Cup
 Winners (16): 2000, 2001, 2003, 2004, 2006, 2007, 2008, 2010, 2011, 2012, 2013, 2014, 2015, 2016, 2020, 2022

Current squad

History 
Klaksvíkar Ítróttarfelag was founded in 1904, but the women's team was founded in mid 80's. The women's stadium, is the same stadium as the men's, Djúpumýra. The women from Klaksvík have since the first day, been a very successful team. They won their first Faroese league title in 1997, and again in 2000. In 2000, KÍ women started a 17 years streak, winning the title every year from 2000 to 2016. Because of this, the women also competed in UEFA Women's Cup, and later on competed in UEFA Women's Champions League. After two disappointing years in 2017 and 2018, the KÍ womens now have a streak of 3 more titles, in 2019, 2020 and 2021, bringing the club up to a total of 21 national championships.
Their last league title was in 2021.

Former internationals
  Faroe Islands: Randi Wardum, Ragna Patawary, Malena Josephsen and Rannvá Andreasen

Results in Europe
KÍ qualified for 17 consecutive UEFA Women's Champions League's between 2001–02 and 2017–18.
Until the 2018–19 campaign, they were the only team to have qualified for every single Champions League.

References

External links
Official website
UEFA profile

Association football clubs established in 1985
Sport in Klaksvík
Women's football clubs in the Faroe Islands
1985 establishments in the Faroe Islands